John Skinner (died after 1395) was a member of the Parliament of England for the constituency of Maldon in Essex in the parliaments of January 1390 and 1393.

References 

Members of Parliament for Maldon
15th-century English people
Year of birth unknown